RV Kronprins Haakon is a Norwegian icebreaking polar research vessel owned by the Norwegian Polar Institute. The shiptime use is divided between the main users,  the University of Tromsø (50%), Norwegian Polar Institute (30%) and Norwegian Institute of Marine Research (20%). She was built at Fincantieri shipyard in Genova, Italy, and delivered in 2018.

Technical details 

The research vessel has accommodation for 55 personnel in 38 cabins, including a crew of 15–17. She is equipped with hangar for two small to medium-sized helicopters, but the helipad in the bow is strengthened also for the heavier helicopters such as NHIndustries NH90 operated by the Norwegian Coast Guard and Eurocopter AS332 Super Puma search and rescue (SAR) helicopters based in Svalbard.

Like most modern icebreakers, Kronprins Haakon has a diesel-electric propulsion system. Her power plant consists of two 3,500kW six-cylinder Bergen B32:40L6 and two 5,000kW 9-cylinder Bergen B32:40L9 medium-speed diesel engines that produce power for two 5.5MW Rolls-Royce US ARC 0.8 FP azimuth thrusters and two 1.1MW bow thrusters. The propulsion system also gives her Dynamic Positioning (DP) Class 1 stationkeeping capability. The bollard pull of the vessel is 158 tonnes.

The hull of Kronprins Haakon is strengthened according to International Association of Classification Societies (IACS) Unified Requirements for Polar Class Ships for operations in winter ice with pressure ridges, multi-year ice and glacial ice inclusions. Her ice class, Polar Class 3, is intended for vessels designed for "year-round operation in second-year ice which may include multi-year ice inclusions".

A high-end research vessel, Kronprins Haakon has an extensive scientific outfit for oceanography, marine biology and geology. The main deck is largely dedicated to scientific activities with 15 fixed and three container laboratories, refrigerated storage rooms, large working deck with cranes and an A-frame for trawling, and a hangar and  moon pool for sampling as well as AUV and ROV operations. Underwater acoustics instrumentation is fitted in two drop keels as well as special "arctic tanks" for operations in ice-covered seas.

Development and construction 

In 1999, the Norwegian Polar Institute issued a proposal for acquiring a new research vessel to replace the 1978-built Lance, a former fishing and sealing vessel that had been rebuilt as a research vessel in 1992. After a feasibility study was completed in 2007, the design contract was awarded to Rolls-Royce Marine (today Kongsberg Maritime Ship Design) in 2008. The initial design was further developed in close co-operation with the Norwegian Polar Institute and other future users of the research vessel and the Kongsberg Ship Design UT 395 vessel concept was approved by the Norwegian Ministry of Finance in 2011. The funding for the construction of the new research vessel was approved by the Norwegian Parliament  and included in the 2013 budget.

On 29 November 2013, the construction of the NOK 1.4 billion (approximately 175 million euro) polar research vessel was awarded to the Italian shipbuilder Fincantieri and the shipbuilding contract was signed on 19 December. The vessel, named Kronprins Haakon after Haakon, Crown Prince of Norway, would be built by Genova-based Riva Trigoso-Muggiano shipyard. Final outfitting and sea trials would be carried out at Fincantieri-owned VARD in Norway.

The first steel for the new Norwegian polar research vessel was cut on 15 June 2015 and the keel was laid on 2 September. Kronprins Haakon, named after the crown prince of Norway, was launched on 3 March 2017 and delivered in April 2018.

The main user of the vessel will be University of Tromsø, also known as the Arctic University of Norway.

Kongsberg Maritime Ship Design later used the experience gained from designing the Norwegian polar research vessel to develop the RRS Sir David Attenborough for the British Antarctic Survey.

Career 

One of the primary users of the new Norwegian polar research vessel is the Nansen Legacy project which will include over 370 ship-days  by 2020 primarily on Kronprins Haakon. In addition, the vessel will regularly sail to the Antarctic.

In July 2019, one of Kronprins Haakons propulsion units developed a lubricating oil leak during icebreaking operations north of Svalbard, forcing the research vessel to cancel a scientific cruise ahead of schedule and return to Norway for repairs. During inspection in Harstad, the cause of the leak was discovered to be a loose bolt in the port side propeller shaft seal. There were no visible signs of damage and the repairs consisted of tightening the bolts in both port and starboard propulsion units and securing them with thread-locking fluid. The scientific cruises were resumed in August 2018.

On 28 July 2022, Kronprins Haakon arrived at the North Pole for the first time, becoming the second Norwegian vessel (after NoCGV Svalbard) to reach the northernmost point on the Earth. Although the ice conditions were reportedly easier than expected, the research vessel was sailing together with the French icebreaking cruise ship Le Commandant Charcot operated by Compagnie du Ponant.

References 

Icebreakers of Norway
Research vessels of Norway
2017 ships
Ships built in Genoa
Ships built by Fincantieri